SACE may refer to: 

South Australian Certificate of Education
Servizi Assicurativi del Commercio Estero (SACE SpA), Italian Export Credit Agency
Southern Alliance for Clean Energy

See also
Supreme Allied Commander Europe (SACEUR)